Anatolia is a large peninsula in West Asia and forms one of the two passages between Asia and Europe. All through history, many states both completely independent and vassal, were founded. Below is the list of states (including principalities) in Anatolia during the late Middle Ages (11th–15th centuries).

See also 

Ancient kingdoms of Anatolia
Anatolian beyliks
History of Anatolia

 
Turkey history-related lists
Medieval Islamic world-related lists